Caus or CAUS may refer to:

 CAUS or Virginia Tech College of Architecture and Urban Studies
 Causal case or causative case
 Council of Alberta University Students
 The Color Association of the United States
 Citizens Against UFO Secrecy
 Salomon de Caus (1576–1626), French engineer
 Caus Castle, the head of a Welsh marcher lordship, but now part of Shropshire
 Kaous, a town in ancient Greece
 Çavuş, Turkish title